Tomorrow Becomes Yesterday is the fourth and final album of the band Bamboo. It is the first release of original material by the band since 2005's Light Peace Love. It achieved platinum status on September 28, 2008 (two days after its release).

In 2010, the band released a new single "Bagong Sigaw" and repackaged version of the album with a bonus DVD containing music videos of the singles released in the album.

Track listing

Personnel 
Francisco "Bamboo" Mañalac - lead vocals
Ira Cruz - guitars
Nathan Azarcon - bass, vocals
Vic Mercado - drums

Album credits 
Mixed and recorded by Angee Rozul/Tracks Studios
Mastered by Gil Tamazyan/Threshold sound+vision
Cover layout: wham!

References

2008 albums
Bamboo (band) albums